Doniawerstal was a municipality in southwest Friesland, south of Sneek. It consisted mainly of grassland and lakes. Its capital was Langweer. The municipality was dissolved in 1984; part went to Wymbritseradiel and part went to Skarsterlân. At the time of its dissolution it had its Dutch name; in West Frisian it was Doanjewerstal.

Former municipalities of Friesland